Żeńsko  is a village in the administrative district of Gmina Wierzchowo, within Drawsko County, West Pomeranian Voivodeship, in north-western Poland. It used to be known in Polish before 1945 as Borujsko.

Żeńsko was then known as Schönfeld, and in Polish as Borujsko. For the history of the region, see History of Pomerania.

The village has a population of 160.

Events
 Battle of Schoenfeld

References

Villages in Drawsko County